The December 2010 Abuja bombing was a bomb attack on a barracks on the outskirts of Abuja, Nigeria, on 31 December 2010. Four people were killed, including a pregnant woman, and 26 were injured; according to defence minister Adetokunbo Kayode, all of the dead were civilians, as were most of the injured. The attack was the second in Abuja in three months, and was the first near a barracks in the country since its return to democracy in 1999.

References

2010 murders in Nigeria
Mass murder in 2010
Terrorist incidents in Nigeria in 2010
21st century in Abuja
Improvised explosive device bombings in Nigeria
Murder in Abuja
December 2010 crimes
December 2010 events in Nigeria
Terrorist incidents in Abuja